The Leesburg Athletics was the final name of a professional minor league baseball team, based in Leesburg, Florida. The club was first formed in 1937 as the Leesburg Gondoliers, a Florida State League team that did not share an affiliation with a big-league club. From 1939–1941 the team became known as the Leesburg Anglers, who again were a non-affiliated minor league team. After not hosting a team from 1942–1945 the Anglers would return in 1946. 
 
From 1947–1948 the team became the Leesburg Pirates, and were a Class-D affiliate of the Pittsburgh Pirates. In 1949 the Brooklyn Dodgers operated the team as the Leesburg Dodgers. They used four different managers as the Dodgers and went 37-97. 44-year-old Luke Hamlin, who managed for them, also pitched in eight games for them. From 1950–1952 they would again become an un-affiliated team known as the Leesburg Packers. In 1953 the team would change its name to the Leesburg Lakers but would remain independent of any affiliation. The team would go on hiatus for two seasons and would then emerge in 1956 as an affiliate of the Milwaukee Braves, known as the Leesburg Braves. They would remain that way until the end of the 1957 season. After that, they would become the Leesburg Orioles from 1960–1961 and were affiliated with the Baltimore Orioles. Again breaking for a few years the team would re-emerge for a final time, this time as the Leesburg A's from 1965–1968, they would be an affiliate of the Kansas City/Oakland A's during this stint.

The Leesburg teams won Florida State League championships in 1941 and 1966.

Notable alumni

Baseball Hall of Fame alumni

 Rollie Fingers (1965) Inducted, 1992

Notable alumni

 Johnny Beazley (1937)

 Darrell Evans (1967) 2 x MLB All-Star

 Luke Hamlin (1949)

 Bobby Knoop (1956) MLB All-Star; 3 x Gold Glove

 Lee Meadows (1937)

 Cal Ripken, Sr. (1961)

 Gene Tenace (1966-1967) MLB All-Star; 1972 World Series Most Valuable Player

Year-by-year record

References

Baseball teams established in 1937
Baseball teams disestablished in 1968
Defunct Florida State League teams
Baltimore Orioles minor league affiliates
Brooklyn Dodgers minor league affiliates
Kansas City Athletics minor league affiliates
Oakland Athletics minor league affiliates
Milwaukee Braves minor league affiliates
Pittsburgh Pirates minor league affiliates
Leesburg, Florida
1968 disestablishments in Florida
Defunct baseball teams in Florida
1937 establishments in Florida